Jorf is a city in Errachidia Province, Drâa-Tafilalet, Morocco. It is divided into several districts: El Mounkara, Jorf-Center, El Achouria, Oualad Ghanem, Oulad moussa, and Erramlia. According to the 2004 census it has a population of 12,135.

References

Populated places in Errachidia Province